Natalie Nicholson (born March 10, 1976 in Bemidji, Minnesota as Natalie Simenson) is an American curler. She is currently the coach of the Tabitha Peterson rink.

Career
As a junior curler, Nicholson played second for Risa O'Connell and represented Team USA at the 1995 and 1997 World Junior Curling Championships finishing sixth and fourth respectively.

In 2000, Nicholson curled in her first World Curling Championships playing lead for Amy Wright and finished in sixth place. Nicholson returned to the Worlds in 2002 as Patti Lank's lead and finished in eighth place. They returned in 2004 finishing in fourth place.

Nicholson would later move to play for Debbie McCormick's team and in 2006 Nicholson won her first international medal- a silver when USA lost to Sweden (skipped by Anette Norberg).

Personal life
Nicholson is employed as a family nurse practitioner and lactation counselor. Nicholson is married and has two children.

Teams

References

External links
 

1976 births
Living people
People from Bemidji, Minnesota
Olympic curlers of the United States
Curlers at the 2010 Winter Olympics
American female curlers
Continental Cup of Curling participants
American curling champions
American curling coaches
21st-century American women